The 1965 World Table Tennis Championships men's doubles was the 28th edition of the men's doubles championship.
Chuang Tse-Tung and Hsu Yin-Sheng won the title after defeating Chang Shih-Lin and Wang Chih-Liang in the final by three sets to nil.

Results

See also
List of World Table Tennis Championships medalists

References

-